"Spit on a Stranger" is a song by American indie rock band Pavement, released as a single on June 22, 1999, from their final record Terror Twilight. It includes the song "Harness Your Hopes", which would become the band's most listened song on the streaming platform Spotify in 2017. A reissue of the EP was released on 8 April 2022, and the announcement of the reissue was accompanied by a music video for “Harness Your Hopes”.

Track listing
 Spit on a Stranger [Album Version] – 3:04
 Harness Your Hopes – 3:26
 Roll with the Wind – 3:17
 The Porpoise and the Hand Grenade – 2:47
 Rooftop Gambler – 3:20
 Harness Your Hopes (Live in Brixton) [Reissue bonus track] - 3:34

Cover versions
"Spit on a Stranger" has been covered by various artists.  Alternative versions include one from progressive bluegrass band Nickel Creek on 2002's This Side, and another recorded by singer-songwriter Kathryn Williams on 2004's Relations.

References

1999 singles
Pavement (band) songs
Music videos directed by Lance Bangs
1998 songs
Song recordings produced by Nigel Godrich
Matador Records singles
Songs written by Stephen Malkmus